is a 26 episode anime series produced by Sunrise and Fuji TV. It was directed by Tetsurō Amino, with Hideki Kakinuma handling series scripts, Yoshi Ichida and Ryō Tanaka designing the characters, Junya Ishigaki and Shinobu Tsuneki designing the mechanical elements and Hiroyuki Namba composing the music. In 1999, it was adapted in a manga series written and illustrated by Iderou Hinoki.

Story
In the year 2187, the planet Earth, is leading the human civilization to certain destruction, caused by global warming. As such people are unable to live on the Earth's surface so they create domed cities, but as time goes by, war and unstable land conditions separate the domes and they lose contact with each other. Shu is a teenage boy from Datania, a school-type city dome controlled by Zero, a data program. With the help of his human assistant Nines, and later Berk, they force the children who live there to live and work as programmed drones using the reset system, which results in the children having no emotions, needs, or human instinct. The series begins when Shu, who dreams of seeing the ocean, escapes with his friends from Datania with the help from, Ein, May, and Dolly from The Returners, rebels of Datania who live underground. Shu goes with the Returners to find  Amaroute, another dome city which they believe to be the better place to live. Along the journey, Shu explores the world he has never seen before, and joins the Returners in fighting Zero and his men who are after DT, a special substance inside humans, which Shu and his Returner friends have. Arriving in Amaroute, the Returners discover that Amaroute is the same as Datania, and likewise, it is controlled by Zero, but assisted this time, by a clone of Shu.
Shu then learns the purpose of Datania and Amaroute is for each to create a rocket that will transport Zero safely in to orbit before a generator that has been preventing global flooding breaks down due to neglect and the world is flooded in a huge tidal wave. After Amaroute falls, Shu and his friends return to Datania to defeat Zero and save both its citizens and the rest of the runners.
The Rocket there cannot be completed in time, but Shu has the idea they instead turn it in to an Ark and ride out the flood  before the tidal wave hits. Work is complete and everyone is loaded aboard, but a technical fault prevents it from being launched just as the generator preventing the flood finally breaks down, forcing Shu and his friends to work against the clock to free it.
In a shock twist, the tidal wave strikes before the Ark is seen being released, leaving the fate of Shu and everyone on board uncertain to the viewer.

Characters

Shu is the protagonist of the story. He is a fourteen year old boy raised in Datania-(a country where young children and adolescent teens are forced into slave labor) who one day escapes the dome of his home country and joins the Returners.

A cheerful 8 year old African boy hacker and one of the Returners. He can call upon Eightron for whenever he and his friends are in immediate danger.

A 15 year old girl and one of the Returners. She often looks after Shu like an older sibling.

A fourteen year old girl who escapes Datania along with her friend Shu.

A seventeen year old teenage boy and one of the Returners.

A GAF commander in Datania.

A survivor from the Dome 13. He always carries a firearm.

The former leader of the Returners.

A powerful and mysterious entity that is often summoned by Dolly when the Returners get into trouble.

Trivia
Some of the characters are named after numbers such as Ein (which is German for one), Nines and Zero.
The show bares some similarity to the animated series Captain Planet, having a strong environmental message. And a protagonist group who in times of emergency will summon a Super-being called Eightron; a super AI who can on a cellular level create a body from any surrounding inorganic matter.

References

External links 
 

1998 anime television series debuts
1999 manga
Adventure anime and manga
Bandai Namco franchises
Comics set in the 22nd century
Sunrise (company)
Television series set in the 22nd century